The National Ilan University (NIU) is a public university in Yilan City, Yilan County, Taiwan.

History
National Ilan University was one of the first institutions of higher education in Taiwan. It was founded as the Taiwan Provincial Ilan School of Agriculture and Forestry on 12 May 1926. Since then, the name and focus of the institution have undergone a number of changes, from having been a five-year junior college (National Ilan Junior College of Agriculture and Technology), and a polytechnic college (National Ilan Institute of Technology). In 2003, the school was further reformed into its current status as a comprehensive university, offering BA, BS, MA and MS degrees in four colleges.

President
Dr. Po-Ching Wu was elected as the 5th NIU President by the NIU President Election Committee on July 4 and was on board from August 1, 2016. Dr. Wu is also a professor in the Department of Biomechatronic Engineering at NIU. He received his PhD in Food engineering at the University of Massachusetts (USA).

Campus
The main  campus stands in the center of Yilan City. The school owns two larger tracts of land, mostly undeveloped, in Yilan City and Wujie Township in Yilan County.

Academics

Ranking

Schools
NIU has four colleges: Humanities and Management, Engineering, Bioresources, and Electrical Engineering and Computer Science. In addition, there are 13 departments and 17 graduate institutions.

The newest of the Graduate Programs is the MA Program in Foreign Languages & Literatures. It focuses on the literature in English of nations within the Asian Pacific Rim region.

University resources
The university has 150 laboratories, one computer center, a number of computerized language labs, and an Analysis and Technology Consulting Center which cooperates with local industries on their manufacturing and production. In 2006, the university also established an Incubator Center, which assists local industries in research and development. In early 2006, NIU was granted the capacity to serve as the GigaPoP ("gigabit point-of-presence") for Taiwan Advanced Research & Education Network (TWAREN). As a result, NIU is in charge of providing a high-bandwidth network connection to research and academic institutes within Ilan county.

Programs for international students 

Most programs are taught in Chinese. * Some master's-level courses are taught in English language

 NIU is one of the Bioresources education and research institutes in Taiwan. NIU students in the Bioresources College have an opportunity to visit Malaysia for off-site classes; and to visit Canada to attend the joint program with University of British Columbia.
 College of Engineering and College of Electrical Engineering and Computer Science of NIU are IEET accredited. IEET is a member of Washington Accord, Seoul Accord, Sydney Accord, and NABEEA.

International Collaboration 
National Ilan University (NIU) collaborates with over 100 Universities and Research Institutions worldwide. When studying at NIU, students can apply for an academic exchange program with partner universities where they can take part in overseas volunteer activities and summer camps. In addition, NIU has a program with the University of Michigan Dearborn Business School, which offers a master's degree to NIU students.

Tuition and miscellaneous fees
Tuition fees and other miscellaneous fees for international students for the academic year 2016.

Note: For details about Tuition Fees & other Miscellaneous fees for 「 Taiwan Scholarship Awardee」kindly follow the link

Laboratory
 Mobility Network Laboratory

Nomenclature 
The Ilan spelling in the school name perpetuates a twentieth-century romanization for the name of the area. Yilan is now preferred by most national and regional authorities.

The standard abbreviated reference in English is the acronym NIU. The standard abbreviation in Mandarin Chinese is the portmanteau 宜大 Yi1 Da4. For this reason the romanization "Yida" is often encountered in place names associated with the campus.

See also 
 List of universities in Taiwan

References 

1926 establishments in Taiwan
Educational institutions established in 1926
Universities and colleges in Yilan County, Taiwan
Universities and colleges in Taiwan
Technical universities and colleges in Taiwan